Operculicarya (also Operculicaria) is a plant genus in the family Anacardiaceae. They are small dioecious pachycaul trees originated from Madagascar. They mainly grow in dry, rocky areas.

Taxonomy

Species

, Plants of the World online has 8 accepted species:

 Operculicarya borealis 
 Operculicarya calcicola 
 Operculicarya capuronii 
 Operculicarya decaryi 
 Operculicarya hirsutissima 
 Operculicarya hyphaenoides 
 Operculicarya multijuga 
 Operculicarya pachypus

References

Anacardiaceae
Anacardiaceae genera
Dioecious plants
Taxa named by Joseph Marie Henry Alfred Perrier de la Bâthie